Njunungar River is a small tributary of both the Pamba in the Indian state of Kerala. It flows near Sabarimala.

References

Rivers of Pathanamthitta district
Pamba River